Takatoshi Kaneko (金子貴俊; born 17 January 1978) is a Japanese actor. He made his debut in the popular 2001 film Waterboys.

Selected filmography
Azumi (2003)
Pretty Woman (2003)
Kumiso (2002)
Jisatsu Saakuru  Suicide Circle (2002)
Hikari no ame a.k.a. Rain of Light (2001)
Waterboys (2001)
Dōbutsu no Mori (film) (2006), the film adaptation of the Animal Crossing video game series.

Television 
Haruka 17 (2005)
Bitworld (2007-)

External links
Official blog

1978 births
Living people
Japanese male actors